Brad Gilbert and Ilie Năstase were the defending champions, but Năstase did not participate this year.  Gilbert partnered Shlomo Glickstein, losing in the first round.

John Letts and Peter Lundgren won the title, defeating Christo Steyn and Danie Visser 6–3, 3–6, 6–3 in the final.

Seeds

  Christo Steyn /  Danie Visser (final)
  Kelly Evernden /  Chip Hooper (quarterfinals)
  Eddie Edwards /  Gary Muller (quarterfinals)
  Charles Bud Cox /  Mark Dickson (quarterfinals)

Draw

Draw

External links
Draw

Tel Aviv Open
1986 Grand Prix (tennis)